Rabiye Kurnaz vs. George W. Bush (German: Rabiye Kurnaz gegen George W. Bush) is a 2022 German-French narrative film directed by Andreas Dresen which premiered at the 72nd Berlin International Film Festival. It is based on the true story of Murat Kurnaz, a young German of Turkish descent, who was unlawfully detained in Guantanamo Bay in 2001, and his mother's legal battle for his release.

Plot 
The film follows the titular Rabiye Kurnaz, a Turkish housewife from Bremen, Germany, as she discovers her eldest son, Murat, has been detained in Pakistan by the United States government. He is held in Guantanamo Bay detention camp, Cuba, for over five years, during which the rather temperamental Rabiye and the more reserved human rights lawyer, Berhard Docke, launch a legal dispute in his name.

Their campaign for a fair trial takes them all the way to the Supreme Court, finally securing his release in 2006, after which it comes to light that the German government had attempted to prevent his return by revoking his right of entry. Murat has been systematically tortured during his extrajudicial detainment and, as of the film's airing, has yet to receive any form of compensation or apology for his treatment.

Cast 

 Meltem Kaptan - Rabiye Kurnaz
 Alexander Scheer - Bernhard Docke
 Charly Hübner - Marc Stocker
 Nazmi Kirik - Mehmet
 Sevda Polat - Nuriye
 Abdullah Emre Öztürk - Murat Kurnaz
 Şafak Şengül - Fadime

Reception 
Writer Laila Stieler and actor Meltem Kaplan received awards for best screenplay and best actress in a starring role respectively at the Berlin Internation Film Festival 2022, while Andreas Dresen was nominated for the main prize, the Golden Bear.

The director, screenwriter, and cast of the film also received several nominations for the German Film Awards.

The film has received mixed reviews, being compared to similar David-and-Goliath stories such as Erin Brockovich or The Blind Side. Some reviewers have criticised its often jovial tone, while others have praised its tendency toward lightheartedness in the face of such gruelling subject matter.

References 

German drama films
French drama films
Films directed by Andreas Dresen
2020s French films